February is the second month of the year.

February may also refer to:

Film
February (2003 film), a Thai romance-drama film
February (2015 film), an American horror film, also known as The Blackcoat's Daughter

Music
"February", a song by A Thorn for Every Heart from their 2004 album Things Aren't So Beautiful Now
"February", a song by The Appleseed Cast from their 2006 album Peregrine
"February", a song by Dar Williams from her 1996 album Mortal City
"February", a song by Thinking Fellers Union Local 282 from their 1994 album Strangers from the Universe

Other
February, Tennessee, a community in the United States